Anthony Maurice Herbert Simpson (28 October 1935 – 14 August 2022) was a British politician who served as a Member of the European Parliament (MEP). He sat as Conservative for the constituency of Northamptonshire from 1979 until 1994.

Simpson died on 14 August 2022, at the  age of 86.

References

1935 births
2022 deaths
Conservative Party (UK) MEPs
MEPs for England 1979–1984
MEPs for England 1984–1989
MEPs for England 1989–1994
Politicians of the Pro-Euro Conservative Party
Politicians from Leicester